Where's Our Revolution is the third studio album by Canadian singer-songwriter Matt Brouwer. It was released on August 25, 2009 through Universal Music Distribution. The album is Brouwer's most successful release to date and was well received with critics calling it, "...a gorgeous piece of work" and commending Brouwer's songwriting and vocal performance. The hit "Sometimes" reached the top 20 on the Billboard Hot Christian Songs chart and 3 other singles received considerable airplay on Christian radio stations in Canada and the US. The album won a Juno Award in 2010 as it was named best Contemporary Christian/Gospel Album of the year, and was also nominated for seven GMA Canada Covenant Awards, winning the Covenant Award for best song and fan favorite artist of the year. The album was nominated for Gospel Recording of the Year by the East Coast Music Awards and Contemporary Christian/Gospel Album and Song of the Year by the Independent Music Awards.

Track listing

Charts

Awards

References

External links
 [ Billboard.com]

2009 albums
Matt Brouwer albums
Juno Award for Contemporary Christian/Gospel Album of the Year albums